Neutral red (toluylene red, Basic Red 5, or C.I. 50040) is a eurhodin dye used for staining in histology. It stains lysosomes red. It is used as a general stain in histology, as a counterstain in combination with other dyes, and for many staining methods. Together with Janus Green B, it is used to stain embryonal tissues and supravital staining of blood. Can be used for staining Golgi apparatus in cells and Nissl granules in neurons.

In microbiology, it is used in the MacConkey agar to differentiate bacteria for lactose fermentation.

Neutral red can be used as a vital stain. The Neutral Red Cytotoxicity Assay was first developed by Ellen Borenfreund in 1984. In the Neutral Red Assay live cells incorporate neutral red into their lysosomes. As cells begin to die, their ability to incorporate neutral red diminishes. Thus, loss of neutral red uptake corresponds to loss of cell viability. The neutral red is also used to stain cell cultures for plate titration of viruses.

Neutral red is added to some growth media for bacterial and cell cultures. It usually is available as a chloride salt.

Neutral red acts as a pH indicator, changing from red to yellow between pH 6.8 and 8.0.

References

Other references
 
 

Azin dyes
Vital stains